Ed Guiney is an Irish-American producer who co-founded film and drama production company Element Pictures with Andrew Lowe in 2001. Element has offices in Dublin, Belfast and London and works across production, distribution and exhibition.

As joint Managing Director, Guiney oversees the development and production of Element's film and television slate. Recent projects include Lenny Abrahamson's Room, Yorgos Lanthimos's The Favourite, and the television series Normal People, also directed by Lenny Abrahamson.

Current film productions include Yorgos Lanthimos's Poor Things, starring Emma Stone, Mark Ruffalo and Willem Dafoe (Film4/Searchlight Pictures); Stephen Williams's historical biopic Chevalier starring Kelvin Harrison Jr. (Searchlight Pictures), and Sebastián Lelio's The Wonder starring Florence Pugh (Netflix).

Current television productions include Shane Meadows's period drama The Gallows Pole (BBC/A24); Nancy Harris's The Dry (BritBox/ITV Studios) directed by Paddy Breathnach, and the adaptation of Sally Rooney's debut novel Conversations with Friends directed by Lenny Abrahamson (BBC/Hulu).

Current and upcoming film releases include Sean Durkin's The Nest; Phyllida Lloyd's Herself and two collaborations with Joanna Hogg – The Eternal Daughter (BBC/A24) and The Souvenir Part II (BBC/A24/Focus) which had its world premiere at the 74th Cannes Film Festival Directors' Fortnight in July 2021.

Ed has been nominated for two Academy Awards for Best Picture and has won two BAFTAs.

References

External links 
Guiney's page at Element Pictures 

Irish film producers
People educated at Gonzaga College
European Film Awards winners (people)
Living people
1966 births